Sam's Lake is a horror film directed by Andrew C. Erin and starring Sandrine Holt, Fay Masterson, and William Gregory Lee, it was an official selection at the 2006 Tribeca Film Festival.

Synopsis

Near an isolated lake, an escaped psychiatric patient makes his way through the forest to his childhood home where he kills his family in their sleep before disappearing into the woods never to be found. Many years later the massacre has become legend as disappearances haunt the surrounding towns.

Sam (Fay Masterson), a young woman who comes back home every summer to the secluded lakeside cottage where she grew up, returns after the death of her father to reconnect with her traditions, old friends and memories of the past. This year, a group of hip, young urbanites, Kate (Sandrine Holt), Franklin (Stephen Bishop), Melanie (Megan Fahlenbock) and Dominik (Salvatore Antonio) join Sam on her annual trip. But when Sam and her friend Jesse (William Gregory Lee), a local to the area, take the group on an adventure to revisit the site of the murders they all come face to face with the terrifying legend of Sam's Lake.

Cast
Fay Masterson as Sam
Sandrine Holt as Kate
William Gregory Lee as Jesse
Megan Fahlenbock as Melanie
Stephen Bishop as Franklin
Salvatore Antonio as Dominik

External links

Trailer

2006 films
2006 horror films
American serial killer films
American slasher films
2000s English-language films
2000s American films